Elisabeth Cornelia Maria "Lillian" van Litsenburg (born 22 April 1957) was a Labor Party politician in the Queensland Parliament representing the Electoral district of Redcliffe.

She was elected in September 2006 at the state election after she unsuccessfully contested the 2005 by-election in which Terry Rogers was elected and held the seat for only a number of months after the resignation of the former Labor member and Speaker of the Queensland Parliament, Ray Hollis.

She was born in the Netherlands in 1957.  Lillian is a local primary school teacher.

She was defeated by Scott Driscoll of the Liberal National Party in 2012 state election.

References

External links
ECQ 2006 State General Election Results - Redcliffe.

Living people
1957 births
Australian Labor Party members of the Parliament of Queensland
Members of the Queensland Legislative Assembly
21st-century Australian politicians
Women members of the Queensland Legislative Assembly
21st-century Australian women politicians